The Morane-Saulnier MS.560 was a French civil aerobatic monoplane designed and built by Morane-Saulnier.

Development
First flown in 1945 the MS.560 was a single-seat low-wing monoplane with a retractable landing gear. Powered by a 75 hp (56 kW) Train 6D-01 piston engine three variants followed all using different engines. In 1946 a two-seat touring variant was produced as the Morane-Saulnier MS.570.

Variants
MS.560
Prototype powered by a  Train 6D-01 engine, one built.
MS.561
Variant powered by a  Mathis G4-Z engine, one built.
MS.562
Variant powered by a  Blackburn Cirrus Minor engine.
MS.563
Variant powered by a  Mathis G4-Z or Walter Minor 4-III engine.
MS.564
1949 variant powered by a Walter Minor 4-III engine, one built.

Specifications (MS.560)

References

Notes

Bibliography

Further reading

MS.560
1940s French sport aircraft
Aerobatic aircraft
Low-wing aircraft
Single-engined tractor aircraft
Aircraft first flown in 1945